Akatsuka is a Japanese surname. Notable people with the surname include:

, Japanese manga artist
, Japanese sport shooter
, Japanese lacquerware artist
Noriko Akatsuka (1937–2016), Japanese linguist 
, Japanese rugby union player

Japanese-language surnames